Hörby FF is a Swedish football club located in Hörby.

History
Hörby FF was founded in 1969 as a merger of IFK Hörby and Hörby BoIF. Hörby FF currently plays in Division 3 which is the fifth tier of Swedish football. They play their home matches at Hörby IP in Hörby.

The club is affiliated to Skånes Fotbollförbund.

Footnotes

External links
 Hörby FF- startsida – Official website

Football clubs in Skåne County